Immanuel Baptist Church is a historic church at 401 E. 200 South in Salt Lake City, Utah.

The Classical Revival church was built in 1910–1911, but not dedicated until 1915. It was added to the National Register of Historic Places in 1978.

References

Baptist churches in Utah
Neoclassical architecture in Utah
Churches on the National Register of Historic Places in Utah
Churches completed in 1910
Churches in Salt Lake City
National Register of Historic Places in Salt Lake City
Neoclassical church buildings in the United States